The Global Artificial Intelligence Summit & Awards (GAISA) is the international level conference on Artificial Intelligence which is organized by AICRA - All India Council for Robotics & Automation every year. The third Edition of GAISA was organized at Vigyan Bhawan, New Delhi inaugurated by Piyush Goyal, Minister of Commerce and Industries. Leading Global AI Experts, Industrialists, Startups and representative of 12 nations were present there. During GAISA, top AI companies, individuals were also awarded for their contribution.

History
The conference was launched first in 2019 as Vigyan Bhawan New Delhi by AICRA with an objective of discussion and exploring Artificial Intelligence in engrossed sectors. The speakers in conference was industry leaders, scholars and senior government officials including Ashutosh Sharma (chemical engineer), Secretary- Department of Science & Technology, Government of India, K. VijayRaghavan, Principal Scientific Adviser to Government of India and many more. Apart from summit, leading AI companies showcased their development and services in exhibition. 
Launch of FutureTech magazine also happened during the summit which is aimed to cover accomplishments, innovations, news in Artificial Intelligence sector.

GAISA Awards
Every year best accomplishments and contribution in Artificial Intelligence are awarded by Ministers of Government of India. In year 2022, Rao Inderjit Singh Minister of Planning, Government of India awarded to winners and in year 2022, Piyush Goyal, Minister of Commerce & Industry given awards to winners.

References

External links
 
 Press Information Bureau, Government of India
 CIO Economic Times
 APN News
 FutureTech Media
 DD India
 ANI News
 Tribune India
 Business News
 The Week
 Photo Division, Government of India

Artificial intelligence conferences